"Bakit Mahal Pa Rin Kita" is a debut single by Filipino singer Mariane Osabel. The song was written by Harish Joya and produced by Kedy Sanchez.

Background and release 
The song was written by Harish Joya and produced by Kedy Sanchez as Osabel's original song in the second of final one-on-one of the fourth season of The Clash. After performing Beyoncé's "Listen", Osabel received an exclusive management contract from GMA Network, music contract from GMA Music, talent contract from GMA Artist Center (now Sparkle), a brand new car, 1 million pesos, and a house and lot.

The official audio was released on February 11, 2022.

Usage in media 
It is locally used for the theme song of The Penthouse: Season 3.

Track listing 
Digital download
"Bakit Mahal Pa Rin Kita"– 2:40

Personnel 
 Mariane Osabel – vocal
 Harish Joya – writer
 Marc Lopez – arranger

References 

2021 songs
2022 debut singles